Herrmannsberg may refer to the following hills in Germany (sorted by height):

 Herrmannsberg (North Palatine Uplands) (536 m), county of Kusel, Rhineland-Palatinate
 Herrmannsberg (Franconian Switzerland) (479 m), near Aufseß, county of Bayreuth, Bavaria
 Herrmannsberg (Lindau) (468 m), near Bodolz, county of Lindau, Bavaria

See also

 Hermannsberg (disambiguation)
 Hermannsburg, a village and a former municipality in the Celle district, in Lower Saxony, Germany
 Herrmann Mountains, in Antarctica, known in German as the Herrmannberge